Ohleria is a genus of fungi in the family Melanommataceae.

The genus name of Ohleria is in honour of Heinrich Ohler (1803-1876), who was a German botanist from the Dr. Senckenberg Foundation in Frankfurt. 

The genus was circumscribed by Karl Wilhelm Gottlieb Leopold Fuckel in Jahrb. Nassauischen Vereins. Naturk. vols. 23-24 on page 163 in 1870.

Species
As accepted by GBIF;
 Ohleria brasiliensis 
 Ohleria clematidis 
 Ohleria haloxyli 
 Ohleria kravtzevii 
 Ohleria modesta 
 Ohleria obducens 
 Ohleria phyllanthi 
 Ohleria phyllanthicolla 
 Ohleria quercicola 
 Ohleria rugulosa 
 Ohleria silicata 
 Ohleria ulmi

References

Melanommataceae